The Short No.3 Biplane was an early British aircraft built by Short Brothers in the late 1900s.

History
The Short No.3 biplane was a follow-on to the company's earlier Short Biplane No.2. The aircraft was ordered by Royal Navy officer Frank McClean on August 3, 1909, and delivered in mid-1910. Although the wingspan is known, the exact configuration and powerplant arrangement are unknown. However, even before completion and flight-testing, the No.3 biplane was judged to be obsolete.

Specifications

Notes

References

Barnes, C.H. Shorts Aircraft Since 1900. London: Putnam, 1967

Short No.3 biplane
1900s British experimental aircraft
Aircraft first flown in 1910